Macrotarsipus microthyris is a moth of the family Sesiidae. It is known from Kenya and Malawi.

References

Sesiidae
Moths of Africa
Moths described in 1919